The Urosporidae are a family of parasitic alveolates in the phylum Apicomplexa.

Taxonomy

There is six genera in this family.

History

This family was created by Léger in 1892.

Description

There are 45 recognised species in this family.

References

Apicomplexa families